The 1997 Cincinnati Open, known by the corporate title of the Great American Insurance ATP Championships was a tennis tournament played on outdoor hard courts. It was the 96th edition of the tournament previously known as the Thriftway ATP Championships, and was part of the ATP Super 9 of the 1997 ATP Tour.  It took place in Mason, Ohio, United States, from August 4 through August 11, 1997.

The tournament had previously appeared on the Tier III of the WTA Tour but no event was held from 1989 to 2003.

Finals

Singles

 Pete Sampras defeated  Thomas Muster, 6–3, 6–4
It was Pete Sampras' 5th title of the year and his 49th overall. It was his 1st Masters title of the year and his 8th overall. It was his 2nd title at the event after winning in 1992.

Doubles

 Mark Woodforde /  Todd Woodbridge defeated  Mark Philippoussis /  Patrick Rafter 7–6, 4–6, 6–4

References

External links
 
 ATP tournament profile

 
Cincinnati Masters
Cincinnati Masters
Great American Insurance ATP Championships
Cincin